You Don't Bring Me Flowers is Neil Diamond's twelfth studio album. It was released in 1978 to capitalize on the success of the title song of the same name, a duet with Barbra Streisand, which had originally appeared as a solo recording on Diamond's previous album, I'm Glad You're Here with Me Tonight.

Cash Box said that of the single "Say Maybe" that it has a slight country and western flavor, and that "Diamond's entrancing vocal is strong."  Record World said that "clever arrangement and full-bodied production accentuate the lovely background vocal chorus."

Track listing

Personnel
 Produced by Bob Gaudio
 Neil Diamond - vocals, possible guitar
The Neil Diamond Band:
 Dennis St. John - Drums
 Richard Bennett - Acoustic and Electric Guitars
 Alan Lindgren - Synthesizer / Piano
 King Errisson - Percussion
 Reinie Press - Bass
 Tom Hensley - Piano and Keyboards
 Linda Press - Vocals
 Doug Rhone - Guitar
 Vince Charles - Percussion
 Orchestra arranged and conducted by Alan Lindgren on:
 You Don't Bring Me Flowers
 Remember Me
 You've Got Your Troubles
 Diamond Girls
 The Dancing Bumble Bee/Bumble Boogie
 Orchestra arranged and conducted by Tom Hensley on:
 The American Popular Song
 Forever in Blue Jeans
 Mothers and Daughters, Fathers and Sons
 Vocal Arrangements by Bob Gaudio
 Background Vocals:
 Maxine Willard Waters
 Julia Tillman Waters - Courtesy of Warner Bros. Records, Inc.
 Venetta Fields, Tom Bahler, Ron Hicklin, Jon Joyce, Gene Morford, Doug Rhone, H.L. Voelker

Charts

Weekly charts

Year-end charts

Certifications

Notes 

Neil Diamond albums
1978 albums
Columbia Records albums
Albums produced by Bob Gaudio
Albums recorded at Sunset Sound Recorders
Albums recorded at A&M Studios